This is a list of films in the Dutch language (Dutch titles in brackets).
 Alice in Glamourland (Ellis in Glamourland)
 All Things Pass (Voorbij, voorbij)
 The Alzheimer Case (De Zaak Alzheimer)
 Antonia's Line (Antonia)
 Black Book (Zwartboek)
 Business Is Business (Wat zien ik?)
 Character (Karakter)
 Cloaca
 De Brief voor Sinterklaas
 Don
 Father's Affair (De Passievrucht)
 Flodder
 Flodders in America (Flodder in Amerika!)
 Floris
 The Fourth Man (De Vierde Man)
 Full Moon Party (Volle maan)
 Godforsaken (Van God Los)
 Grimm
 Gruesome School Trip (De Griezelbus)
 Hostel
 Hush Hush Baby (Shouf Shouf Habibi!)
 I Love You Too (Ik ook van jou)
 Kameleon 2 
 Kauwboy
 Keetje Tippel
 Keep Off (Afblijven)
 Kneeling on a Bed of Violets (Knielen op een bed violen)
 Loonies (Loenatik - De moevie)
 Lost Years (Verloren Jaren)
 Everything is love (Alles is Liefde)
 Love to Love (Liever verliefd)
 Moscow, Belgium (Aanrijding in Moscou)
 Peter Bell (Pietje Bell)
 Peter Bell II: The Hunt For The Czar Crown (Pietje Bell II: De jacht op de tsarenkroon)
 Phileine Says Sorry (Phileine zegt sorry)
 Polleke
 Redbad
 TBS
 The Preacher (De Dominee)
 De Schippers van de Kameleon
 Schnitzel Paradise (Het Schnitzelparadijs)
 Soldier of Orange (Soldaat van Oranje)
 Someone Else's Happiness (Iemand anders zijn geluk)
 Spetters
 Tow Truck Pluck (Pluk van de Petteflet)
 Turkish Delight (Turks fruit)
 Undercover Kitty (Minoes)
 The Vanishing (Spoorloos)
 Waiter (Ober)
 Winter in Wartime (Oorlogswinter)
 Zoop in Africa (Zoop in Afrika)
 Zoop in India

Language
 
Dutch